Shanice Craft (born 15 May 1993 in Mannheim) is a German athlete who competes in the discus throw and shot put. She won three consecutive bronze medals in the discus throw at the 2014, 2016 and 2018 European Championships. In addition, she won multiple medals in various junior categories.

Her father is an African-American former U.S. Army soldier and her mother is German.

Competition record

Personal bests
Outdoor
Shot put – 17.75 (Ulm 2014)
Discus throw – 65.88 (Ulm 2014)
Indoor
Shot put – 17.66 (Dortmund 2013)

References

 

German female shot putters
German female discus throwers
1993 births
Living people
German people of African-American descent
Sportspeople from Mannheim
Athletes (track and field) at the 2010 Summer Youth Olympics
World Athletics Championships athletes for Germany
European Athletics Championships medalists
Athletes (track and field) at the 2016 Summer Olympics
Olympic athletes of Germany
Youth Olympic gold medalists for Germany
Youth Olympic gold medalists in athletics (track and field)
21st-century German women